The 1934 Cal Aggies football team represented the Northern Branch of the College of Agriculture—now known as the University of California, Davis—as a member of the Far Western Conference (FWC) during the 1933 college football season. Led by seventh-year head coach Crip Toomey, the Aggies compiled an overall record of 0–5–3 with a mark of 0–2–2 in conference play, placing fifth in the FWC. The team was outscored by its opponents 163 to 16 for the season. The Aggies were shut out in six of their eight games. The Cal Aggies played home games at A Street field on campus in Davis, California.

Schedule

Notes

References

Cal Aggies
UC Davis Aggies football seasons
Cal Aggies f